The 2020–21 FC Arsenal Tula season was the 5th successive season that the club played in the Russian Premier League, the highest tier of association football in Russia. Arsenal Tula finished the season in 14th place and where knocked out of the Russian Cup in the Quarterfinals by CSKA Moscow.

Season events
On 11 October, Arsenal Tula signed Kirill Panchenko from Tambov.

On 15 October, Luka Đorđević returned to Arsenal Tula on loan from Lokomotiv Moscow, having previously played for Arsenal on loan from Zenit St.Petersburg during the 2017–18 and 2018–19 seasons.

On 2 November, Sergei Podpaly was fired as manager, with Dmytro Parfenov being appointed as his replacement.

On 12 January, Arsenal Tula announced the signing of Igor Konovalov on loan from Rubin Kazan for the remainder of the season.

Squad

Out on loan

Transfers

In

Loans in

Out

Loans out

Released

Friendlies

Competitions

Overview

Premier League

Results summary

Results by round

Results

League table

Russian Cup

Round of 32

Round of 16

Squad statistics

Appearances and goals

|-
|colspan="14"|Players away from the club on loan:

|-
|colspan="14"|Players who appeared for Arsenal Tula but left during the season:

|}

Goal scorers

Clean sheets

Disciplinary record

References

FC Arsenal Tula seasons
Arsenal Tula